SS Sagamore was a transatlantic cargo liner that was built in Ireland in 1892 for George Warren's White Diamond Steam Ship Company. In 1913 she was modified to carry passengers as well as cargo. In 1917 a German U-boat sank her, causing the death of 52 members of her crew.

Building
Harland and Wolff built Sagamore in 1892, launching her on 8 September and completing her on 30 November. She had one funnel and four masts.

Sagamores UK official number was 102059 and her code letters were MVQR.

In 1893 Harland and Wolff built a sister ship, Sachem, also for the White Diamond SS Co. Sachem was  longer than Sagamore, but the two ships were otherwise similar in specification and appearance.

Passenger accommodation
In 1912 George Warren sold a controlling interest in his White Diamond SS Co to Furness, Withy and Co. In 1913 the new owners had Sagamore and Sachem modified with the addition of accommodation for 60 second class passengers.

By 1914 Sagamore carried a wireless telegraphy installation, operated by the Marconi Company. Her call sign was MPT.

Service
On 17 June 1913 she ran down and sank the American fishing schooner "Olympia" off Sable Island, Nova Scotia, killing six of Olympia's.

Loss
On 27 February 1917 Sagamore left Boston on her usual route to Liverpool. On 3 March she was in the Western Approaches when the German U-boat  hit her with one torpedo amidships on her port side. She took half an hour to sink, giving her crew time to get clear in three lifeboats. But overnight a gale separated the three boats, and two of them were never seen again.

On 12 March the Blue Funnel Line steamship Deucalion, outbound from the UK to South Africa, found one of Sagamores lifeboats. By then ten men had died in the boat, only seven survivors remained and several were suffering from frostbite. On 6 April Deucalion landed them at Cape Town, where they were hospitalised. In five cases the frostbite had led to gangrene and the men's feet had to be amputated.

Wreck
The nearest land is Dunmore Head in County Kerry.

It is in what are now the territorial waters of the Republic of Ireland. Ireland's National Monuments Service records it as wreck number W05890. Being more than a century old, the wreck is automatically protected by the National Monuments (Amendment) Act, 1987, section 3, sub-section (4).

References

Bibliography

1892 ships
Maritime incidents in 1917
Ships built in Belfast
Ships built by Harland and Wolff
Ships sunk by German submarines in World War I
Shipwrecks of Ireland
Steamships of the United Kingdom
World War I merchant ships of the United Kingdom
World War I shipwrecks in the Atlantic Ocean